New York City's 38th City Council district is one of 51 districts in the New York City Council. It is currently represented by Democrat Alexa Avilés, who assumed office in 2022.

Geography
District 38 is based largely in Sunset Park along Brooklyn's western shoreline, also covering Red Hook, Greenwood Heights, and small parts of Windsor Terrace, Dyker Heights, and Borough Park. Green-Wood Cemetery and Sunset Park proper are also located within the district.

The district overlaps with Brooklyn Community Boards 6, 7, 10, 11, and 12, and with New York's 7th, 9th, and 10th congressional districts. It also overlaps with the 17th, 20th, 21st, 22nd, 23rd, and 25th districts of the New York State Senate, and with the 44th, 48th, 49th, 51st, and 52nd districts of the New York State Assembly.

Recent election results

2021
In 2019, voters in New York City approved Ballot Question 1, which implemented ranked-choice voting in all local elections. Under the new system, voters have the option to rank up to five candidates for every local office. Voters whose first-choice candidates fare poorly will have their votes redistributed to other candidates in their ranking until one candidate surpasses the 50 percent threshold. If one candidate surpasses 50 percent in first-choice votes, then ranked-choice tabulations will not occur.

The table below shows the unofficial first-place votes received by each candidate thus far; ranked-choice tabulations and absentee ballots both currently remain uncounted.

2017

2013

References

New York City Council districts